The Defence Batteries were units of the Royal Artillery created for beach defence during World War II when the United Kingdom was threatened with invasion after the Dunkirk evacuation. Once they had served their purpose they were disbanded or converted into units of field artillery.

Home defence
After the British Expeditionary Force was evacuated from Dunkirk and the UK was threatened with invasion, a crash programme of installing coastal artillery batteries was implemented in the summer of 1940.

Later, as the Home Defence strategy developed, the Royal Artillery formed a number of  'Defence Batteries' to deploy around the coastline for general beach defence. These were not part of the fixed defences of the  RA's Coast Artillery branch covering the ports (although it had long been the practice for garrison artillery units to be equipped with a handful of mobile guns, in addition to their primary fixed guns, for similar usage), nor were they included in the field forces under Commander-in-Chief, Home Forces, but equipped with whatever old direct-fire guns were available they freed up scarce field artillery from semi-static beach defence for the mobile counter-attack forces. Most of these batteries were formed on 1 September 1940.

The batteries would have been formed around a cadre of gunners from existing units. For example, 901 (Independent) Defence Bty was commanded by an officer transferred from 135th (East Anglian) (Hertfordshire Yeomanry) Field Regiment, which was defending the Norfolk coastline with a variety of obsolete guns. The 135th also supplied 64 gunners, but these were recruits who had only just joined the regiment.

Most of the defence batteries were grouped into regiments on 4 October 1940:
 1st Defence Regiment, Royal Artillery, formed at Chelmsford, Essex – disbanded 15 March 1941
 903, 904 Def Btys – disbanded 15 March 1941
 905 Def Bty – to 2nd Def Rgt 15 March 1941 
 2nd Defence Regiment, Royal Artillery, formed at Saxmundham, Norfolk
 907, 808 Def Btys
 909 Def Bty  – disbanded 15 March 1941
 905 Def Bty  – from 1st Def Rgt 15 March 1941
 3rd Defence Regiment, Royal Artillery, formed at Horsmonden, Kent
 911 Def Bty – disbanded 15 March 1941
 912, 913, 914 Def Btys
 4th Defence Regiment, Royal Artillery, formed at Eastbourne, East Sussex – disbanded 15 March 1941
 915 Def Bty – independent from 15 March 1941
 916 Def Bty – disbanded 15 March 1941
 5th Defence Regiment, Royal Artillery, formed at Steyning, West Sussex
 917, 918 Def Btys
 919 Def Btys  – disbanded 15 March 1941
 6th Defence Regiment, Royal Artillery, formed at Eynsford, Kent  – disbanded 15 March 1941
 920, 921, 922 Def Btys  – disbanded 15 March 1941
 7th Defence Regiment, Royal Artillery, formed in Lincolnshire 
 924, 927, 928 Def Btys  – disbanded 15 March 1941
925, 926, 929 Dev Btys
 8th Defence Regiment, Royal Artillery, formed at Leven, East Riding of Yorkshire
 930, 932, 933, Def Btys
 931, 934 Def Btys  – disbanded 15 March 1941
 9th Defence Regiment, Royal Artillery, formed at Newcastle upon Tyne
 935 Def Bty
 936, 937, 938, 939, 940, 941 Def  Btys  – disbanded 15 March 1941
 10th Defence Regiment, Royal Artillery, formed at Mere, Wiltshire
 944, 946, 948, 950 Def Btys  – disbanded 15 March 1941
 945, 947, 949 Def Btys
 11th Defence Regiment, Royal Artillery, formed at Bude, Cornwall
 951 Def Bty  – disbanded 15 March 1941
 952, 953, 954 Def Btys
 12th Defence Regiment, Royal Artillery, formed at Dunster, Somerset
 955, 956 Def Btys
 13th Defence Regiment, Royal Artillery, formed at Hightown, Lancashire
 957 Def Bty
 958 Def Bty – independent from 15 March 1941
 14th Defence Regiment, Royal Artillery, formed at Swansea, South Wales
 959 Def Bty – disbanded 12 April 1941
 960, 961 Def Btys
 964 Def  Bty – from 15th Def Rgt 12 April 1941
 15th Defence Regiment, Royal Artillery, formed at Alcester, Warwickshire  – disbanded 9 April 1941
 962, 963, 964 Def Btys – disbanded 9 April 1941
 964 Def  Bty – to 14th Def Rgt 12 April 1941
 Independent batteries:
 901 (Ind) Def Bty – disbanded 3 March 1941
 902, 906, 923, 942, 943 (Ind) Def Btys
 910 (Ind) Def Bty – disbanded 15 March 1941
 915 (Ind) Def Bty – from 4th Def Rgt 15 March 1941
 958 (Ind) Def Bty – from 13th Def Rgt 15 March 1941

Field Force
By the beginning of 1942 the imminent threat of invasion had passed, the coast artillery batteries were fully established, and the RA required gunners for the field forces. The remaining defence regiments and independent batteries  in the UK were disbanded or converted into field artillery on 12 January 1942:
 2nd Defence Rgt became 171st Field Rgt
 3rd Defence Rgt became 172nd Field Rgt
 5th Defence Rgt disbanded, personnel to 172nd Field Rgt
 7th Defence Rgt with personnel of 923 (Ind) Def Bty became 173rd Field Rgt
 8th Defence Rgt became 174th Field Rgt
 9th Defence Rgt disbanded
 10th Defence Rgt became 175th Field Rgt
 11th Defence Rgt became 176th Field Rgt
 12th Defence Rgt disbanded, personnel of 956 Def Bty to 172nd Field Rgt
 14th Defence Rgt with personnel of 958 (Ind) Def Bty became 177th Field Rgt

Most of these new field regiments served in reserve or holding formations, training reinforcements for units serving in active theatres, though 172nd Field Rgt did serve through the Tunisian and Italian campaigns, and 177th Field Rgt was used to reform the Regular Army's 25th Field Rgt, which had been captured at the Fall of Tobruk.

Overseas
A number of defence batteries and regiments were also formed during the war in British overseas garrisons:
 16th Defence Regiment, Royal Artillery, formed in Singapore on 24 February 1941 from 10th  Mobile Coast Rgt. It was captured by the Japanese at the Fall of Singapore on 15 February 1942.Frederick, pp. 620, 886.
 966 Def Bty (18-pounder guns) – converted from 30 Mobile Coast Bty (or 34 Coast Bty?), Hong Kong–Singapore Royal Artillery (HKSRA)
 967 Def Bty, HKSRA (18-pounder guns) – converted from 21 Mobile Coast Bty, RA
 968 Def Bty, HKSRA (2-pounder guns)– converted from 22 Mobile Coast Bty, HKSRA
 17th Defence Regiment, Royal Artillery, formed in Malta on 24 February 1941 from 13th Mobile Coast Rgt (itself converted from 26th Anti-Tank Rgt on 3 September 1939). As Regular Army units, the batteries retained their existing numbers on conversion rather than take the defence battery numbers (969–72) reserved for them, and on 29 June 1941 the regiment was itself redesignated as 26th Defence Rgt. It served through the Siege of Malta and then on 18 September 1943 was converted into 26th Medium Rgt for service in the Italian Campaign.Frederick, p. 732.Joslen, p. 464.Joslen, pp. 484–5.
 15 Def Bty – 15/40 Def Bty from 22 August 1941
 40 Def Bty
 48 Def Bty – 48/71 Def Bty from 22 August 1941
 71 Def Bty
 13 Def Bty, Royal Malta Artillery (RMA) – formed and joined 22 August 1941; transferred to 5th Coast Rgt, RMA, 1 June 1942
 18th Defence Regiment, Royal Artillery, formed in Gibraltar as a Mobile Coast Rgt on 1 December 1940 with one field, one medium and one anti-tank battery, and redesignated 18th Def Rgt on 1 April 1941. Regimental Headquarters (RHQ) became RHQ 18th Medium Rgt on 5 January 1944 and the batteries were disbanded on 5 March 1944. 18th Medium Rgt later served in the Italian Campaign.
 973 Def Bty – converted from field bty
 974 Def Bty – converted from medium bty
 975 Def Bty – converted from anti-tank bty
 805th Defence Regiment, Royal Artillery', was formed in Middle East Forces on 25 October 1943 and disbanded on 30 November 1943
 A & B Field Btys

In addition, 965 Defence Bty, converted from 36 Heavy Bty, HKSRA, and equipped with 18-pdr and 2-pdr guns, served as part of the mobile coast defences of Hong Kong and was captured by the Japanese at the Fall of Hong Kong on 25 December 1941.

Notes

References
 Basil Collier, History of the Second World War, United Kingdom Military Series: The Defence of the United Kingdom, London: HM Stationery Office, 1957/Uckfield: Naval & Military, 2004 ISBN 978-1-84574-055-9.
 Gen Sir Martin Farndale, History of the Royal Regiment of Artillery: The Years of Defeat: Europe and North Africa, 1939–1941, Woolwich: Royal Artillery Institution, 1988/London: Brasseys, 1996, ISBN 1-85753-080-2.
 Gen Sir Martin Farndale, History of the Royal Regiment of Artillery: The Far East Theatre 1939–1946, London: Brasseys, 2002, ISBN 1-85753-302-X.
 J.B.M. Frederick, Lineage Book of British Land Forces 1660–1978, Vol II, Wakefield: Microform Academic, 1984, ISBN 1-85117-009-X.
 Lt-Col H.F. Joslen, Orders of Battle, United Kingdom and Colonial Formations and Units in the Second World War, 1939–1945, London: HM Stationery Office, 1960/Uckfield: Naval & Military Press, 2003, ISBN 1-843424-74-6.
 Denis Rollo, The Guns and Gunners of Malta, Valetta: Mondial, 1999, ISBN 99909-68-84-5.
 Lt-Col J.D. Sainsbury, The Hertfordshire Yeomanry Regiments, Royal Artillery, Part 1: The Field Regiments 1920-1946'', Welwyn: Hertfordshire Yeomanry and Artillery Trust/Hart Books, 1999, ISBN 0-948527-05-6.

Units and formations of the Royal Artillery